Iosif Novac (16 August 1922 – 1995) was a Romanian swimmer. He competed in the men's 100 metre freestyle at the 1952 Summer Olympics.

References

External links
 

1922 births
1995 deaths
Romanian male freestyle swimmers
Olympic swimmers of Romania
Swimmers at the 1952 Summer Olympics
Sportspeople from Timișoara